Saharat Panmarchya, born July 3, 1998) is a Thai professional footballer who plays as a midfielder for PT Prachuap.

External links

1998 births
Living people
Saharat Panmarchya
Association football midfielders
Saharat Panmarchya
Saharat Panmarchya